Henry W. Heisch (June 10, 1872 – 1941) was a Private serving in the United States Marine Corps during the Boxer Rebellion who received the Medal of Honor for bravery.

Biography
Heisch was born June 10, 1872, in Latendorf, Germany, and after entering the Marine Corps, he was sent as a private to China to fight in the Boxer Rebellion.

While fighting the enemy in Tientsin, China on June 20, 1900, he and a few other soldiers crossed the river in a small boat while under heavy fire and they assisted in destroying buildings occupied by the enemy. For this action, he received the Medal of Honor from President Theodore Roosevelt on March 22, 1902.

He died in 1941 in Napa County, California and is buried in Napa, California at Tulocay Cemetery.

Medal of Honor citation
Rank and organization: Private, U.S. Marine Corps. Born: 10 June 1872, Latendorf, Germany. Accredited to: California. G.O. No.: 84, 22 March 1902.

Citation:

In action against the enemy at Tientsin, China, 20 June 1900. Crossing the river in a small boat while under heavy fire, Heisch assisted in destroying buildings occupied by the enemy.

See also

List of Medal of Honor recipients
List of Medal of Honor recipients for the Boxer Rebellion

References

External links

1872 births
1941 deaths
United States Marine Corps Medal of Honor recipients
United States Marines
American military personnel of the Boxer Rebellion
German emigrants to the United States
German-born Medal of Honor recipients
Boxer Rebellion recipients of the Medal of Honor
People from Segeberg